Astro AEC (abbreviation for Asian Entertainment Channel) is a 24-hour in house Mandarin-generic television channel in Malaysia, owned by Astro. The channel broadcasts local productions in addition to productions from Singapore, Taiwan and mainland China.

Astro AEC HD was launched on 16 November 2014 for Astro subscribers who subscribed to HD service. Subtitles are provided in Bahasa Malaysia, English and Chinese where available.

References

External links 

Official Website of Astro AEC
Official Facebook of Astro AEC

Astro Malaysia Holdings television channels
Television channels and stations established in 1996